Sheba Temple is a -elevation summit located in the eastern Grand Canyon, in Coconino County of northern Arizona, United States. The west of Sheba Temple's drainage is the short Asbestos Canyon which drains Krishna Shrine, northwest, Vishnu Temple (Grand Canyon), northwesterly, and Rama Shrine, north; the east side of Sheba Temple's drainage are short north drainages to the Colorado.

Sheba Temple is composed of extreme cliff-erosion-remnants of Redwall Limestone, (very vertical and very narrow, ~north-south aligned), upon a platform of Muav Limestone; as unit three of the 3-member Cambrian Tonto Group, the Muav is also upon wide slope-former slopes of the dull-greenish Bright Angel Shale. Sheba Temple is a narrow ridgeline trending slightly north-northeast-by-south-southwest and has been geologically detached from the Redwall cliff extending south from Rama Shrine. Of note, the remnant, white prominence, is the same elevation as Solomon Temple east, Solomon's is an actual small platform of a white cliff-former. Sheba Temple's prominence is only a remainder of that cliff-former (Redwall interlayer).

References

External links

 Aerial view, Sheba Temple, Mountainzone

Grand Canyon
Grand Canyon National Park
Colorado Plateau
Landforms of Coconino County, Arizona
Mountains of Coconino County, Arizona
North American 1000 m summits